Lambs Head, also known as Kahlpahlim Rock, is a mountain near Mareeba in the Dinden National Park, Far North Queensland, Australia. Lambs Head rises  and is the highest point on the Lamb Range.

There are two trails that when combined, create a difficult 12.3 km circuit that takes hikers to the summit and back.

See also

 List of mountains of Australia

References

Mountains of Queensland